Revenge was a band formed by New Order bassist Peter Hook (vocals, bass, keyboards) and Lavolta Lakota and Rawhead singer Davyth Hicks (aka Dave Hicks) on guitar and vocals, together with Chris Jones (keyboards). Revenge formed during New Order's hiatus in 1989-1990 and played their final gigs in January 1993. After their industrial rock/house music hybrid album One True Passion was written and recorded, the band was joined on stage by David Potts (bass and guitar) and Ash Taylor on drums.

The band toured the first album worldwide playing gigs in Europe, North and South America and Japan in 1991. It was after the Japan tour that Hicks decided to leave, quoting "musical differences", but more with the feeling of frustration over the direction of Revenge and his own desire to return to being lead singer. He formed Rawhead in Manchester and reformed the band in Scotland in 1993.

In May 1991 the band recruited new members Brian Whittaker (bass and guitar) and Mike Hedges (drums) who debuted at the Cities in The Park Festival. After completion of touring and promoting New Order's 1993 album Republic, Hook returned to Revenge with the intention of recording a new album. However, the band soon disintegrated and Hook retained the talents of only David Potts when later forming Monaco.

It has often been speculated that the band's name referred to Hook seeking revenge on Bernard Sumner for the latter's formation of the band Electronic with Johnny Marr. In fact, the name came from the word Revenge emblazoned on a leather jacket worn by George Michael in the video for his hit song, "Faith".

Discography

Albums
One True Passion (1990)
One True Passion V2.0 (2004), later re-released with a bonus CD, Be Careful What You Wish For, with a total of 23 additional tracks; V2.0 has more than three times as many tracks as the original release.
No Pain No Gain (2005), live material recorded in 1991

Singles

Extended plays
Gun World Porn (EP, 1991)

References

External links
Bio by Claude Flowers at LTM
Bio from the fansite "World in Motion"
Bio from the fansite "neworderonline.com"

English electronic music groups
English alternative rock groups
Musical groups from Manchester
Musical groups established in 1989
Musical groups disestablished in 1993
Factory Records artists